Joe Gittleman (born April 6, 1968 in Cambridge, Massachusetts) is an American musician, best known as the bass guitar player for The Mighty Mighty Bosstones.  His proficiency on bass earned him the nickname "the Bass Fiddleman."

Career
Gittleman originally played guitar in the Bosstones, but he switched roles with former Bosstone Nate Albert when he realized he had a better bass than guitar. He has also played bass in Gang Green and sang in and produced records for his band Avoid One Thing.

He provided background vocals for the Street Dogs' 2005 album Back to the World as well as the more recent Fading American Dream. In addition, Gittleman produced The Briggs' new album Back to Higher Ground as well as the Flogging Molly album Whiskey on a Sunday, Big D and the Kids Table's albums Strictly Rude and Fluent In Stroll and Chuck Ragan's CD "Los Feliz". Gittleman has also written songs for bands such as MxPx ("Heard That Sound") and has seen Avoid One Thing covered by The Bouncing Souls ("Lean on Sheena"). Since 2005, Gittleman has been a full-time staff producer and A+R for the Los-Angeles-based independent label Side One Dummy Records. Gittleman actively posts content on the MySpace site for The Mighty Mighty Bosstones and continues to play in their most recent incarnation.

While in Italy in 1993 with The Mighty Mighty Bosstones, Gittleman was stabbed in the chest by an Albanian bootlegger. This was documented in the song "The Pirate Ship" on the vinyl release of Question the Answers. Gittleman began working as an instructor at Northern Vermont University in Lyndonville, Vermont. On May 16, 2012, he was promoted to Assistant Professor.

References 

 http://www.angelfire.com/wi/kkimska2/joegbio.html

1968 births
Living people
Guitarists from Massachusetts
American male bass guitarists
20th-century American bass guitarists
The Mighty Mighty Bosstones members
20th-century American male musicians